The following is about the qualification rules and the quota allocation for the cross-country skiing events at the 2022 Winter Olympics in Beijing.

Qualification rules

Basic Quota

A total of 296 athletes will be allowed to compete in cross-country skiing, 148 men and 148 women.  For any National Olympic Committee to send at least one male, or one female competitor, they must have an athlete of that gender score less than 300 FIS points in any individual event at either the 2021 World Championships, or the under 23 World Championships.

'A' Standard

An athlete who has less than 100 FIS Distance points on the list published on 17 January 2022, can be entered in any event.

'B' Standard

An athlete who has not met the 'A' standard, but has less than 300 FIS Distance points may be entered in the 15 km men's or 10 km women's race, as well as in the team relay.  Similarly, athletes who have less than 300 FIS Sprint points may be entered in the sprint, or the team sprint.

Additional Relay eligibility

Athletes who are entered in Nordic Combined or Biathlon, at the 2022 Olympics, may also be used in the relay events.  They must have a valid FIS code and have met the appropriate 'B' standard.

Allocation of Quotas

Quota per NOC.
A FIS Cross Country Nation Ranking will be used that takes into account results, from each gender, from the 2020-2021 season. Nations ranked one through five will receive four additional quotas, nations six through ten receive three, nations eleven through twenty receive two, and nations twenty-one through thirty receive one.

Remaining quota places.
In each gender, the remainder of the quota places will be distributed in four rounds using the Nation Ranking proceeding from the highest ranked nation down.  Nations from 1 to 5 receive an additional quota in round one.  Nations from 1 to 10 receive an additional quota in round two.  Nations from 1 to 20 receive an quota in round three.  All remaining quotas are distributed in round four.

Host quota
If the host has not received four quotas, in each gender, and have remaining athletes who have met at least the 'B' standard, they will be allotted up to four athletes per gender.

Quota Allocation
As of 22 January 2021.

Current summary
Each NOC listed has qualified one competitor in the gender indicated, numbers higher than one are based on rankings and will change as rankings change.

Men

Remaining quotas

Women

Remaining quotas

References

External links
FIS official Olympic qualification tables.

Qualification for the 2022 Winter Olympics
Qualification